The Erianthinae are a subfamily of Asian grasshoppers in the family Chorotypidae and based on the type genus Erianthus. There are currently 12 genera and more than 40 described species recorded from southern China, Japan, Indo-China and Malesia.

Genera
These 12 genera belong to the subfamily Erianthinae:

 Bennia Burr, 1899
 Bornerianthus Descamps, 1975
 Butania Bolívar, 1903
 Erianthella Descamps, 1975
 Erianthina Descamps, 1975
 Erianthus Stål, 1875
 Khaserianthus Descamps, 1975
 Macroerianthus Descamps, 1975
 Pieltainerianthus Descamps, 1975
 Pseuderianthus Descamps, 1975
 Stenerianthus Descamps, 1975
 Xenerianthus Descamps, 1975

References

External links
 

Caelifera
Orthoptera of Asia